The 2002–03 season was AS Monaco FC's 46th season in Ligue 1. They finished second in Ligue 1, qualifying for the group stage of the 2003–04 UEFA Champions League. The club also competed in the Coupe de France, where it lost in the Round of 64 to Wasquehal Football, and the Coupe de la Ligue, defeating Sochaux in the final on 17 May 2003.

Overview
Monaco finished the Ligue 1 season in second place, just 1 point behind league champions Lyon. Monaco were the highest scoring side in the division with 66 goals and striker Shabani Nonda was the golden boot winner with 26 goals. Winger Jérôme Rothen contributed 18 assists in the league campaign and also finished first in the league in that statistic. Both players were included in the end of season Ligue 1 team of the year.

Squad

Competitions

Ligue 1

League table

Results summary

Results by round

Coupe de la Ligue

Notes

References

Monaco
AS Monaco FC seasons
AS Monaco
AS Monaco